Kovač is a South Slavic surname.

Kovač may also refer to:

Kovač (Jičín District), a municipality and village in the Czech Republic
Kovač, Makedonski Brod, a village in North Macedonia
Kovač, Pljevlja, a village in Montenegro
Kovač planina, a mountain in Bosnia and Herzegovina
Kovač Hill, a hill in Križ, Sevnica in Slovenia

See also
 
Kováč, a surname
Kovach (disambiguation) (Ковач)
Kovách, a surname
Kovači (disambiguation)
Kovačić (disambiguation)
Kovačići (disambiguation)
Kovačica (disambiguation)
Kovačice, a village
Kovačina, a village
Kovačevo (disambiguation)
Kovačevac (disambiguation)
Kovačevci (disambiguation)
Kovačevići (disambiguation)
Kováčová (disambiguation)
Kováčovce, a village
Kovak (disambiguation)
Kovack, a surname
Kovacs, a surname